The European Algae Biomass Association (EABA), established on 2 June 2009, is the European association representing both research and industry in the field of algae technologies.

EABA was founded during its inaugural conference on 1–2 June 2009 at Villa La Pietra in Florence. The association is headquartered in Florence, Italy.

History 
The first EABA's President, Prof. Dr. Mario Tredici, served a 2-year term since his election on 2 June 2009. The EABA Vice-presidents were Mr. Claudio Rochietta, (Oxem, Italy), Prof. Patrick Sorgeloos (University of Ghent, Belgium) and Mr. Marc Van Aken (SBAE Industries, Belgium). The EABA Executive Director was Mr. Raffaello Garofalo.

EABA had 58 founding members and the EABA reached 79 members in 2011.

The last election occurred on 3 December 2018 in Amsterdam. The EABA's President is Mr. Jean-Paul Cadoret (Algama / France). The EABA Vice-presidents are Prof. Dr. Sammy Boussiba (Ben-Gurion University of the Negev / Israel), Prof. Dr. Gabriel Acien (University of Almeria / Spain) and Dr. Alexandra Mosch (Germany). The EABA General Manager is Dr. Vítor Verdelho (A4F AlgaFuel, S.A. / Portugal) and Prof. Dr. Mario Tredici (University of Florence / Italy) is elected as Honorary President.

Cooperation with other organisations 
ART Fuels Forum
European Society of Biochemical Engineering Sciences 
Algae Biomass Organization

References

External links 
Twitter  
Facebook 
LinkedIn

Algae biofuels

College and university associations and consortia in Europe